Hjertenes is a Norwegian surname. Notable people with the surname include:

Dagfinn Hjertenes (1943–2006), Norwegian politician 
Øyulf Hjertenes (born 1979), Norwegian economist, journalist, and newspaper editor

Norwegian-language surnames